Ipecac Recordings is an independent record label based in California. It was founded on April 1, 1999 by Greg Werckman (ex-label manager of Alternative Tentacles, ex-lead singer of DUH, ex-employee of Mercury Records) and Mike Patton (Faith No More, Mr. Bungle, Fantômas, Tomahawk, Peeping Tom and Mondo Cane) in Alameda, California.

Originally the label was created for the sole purpose of releasing the first Fantômas album. Since then, they have gone on to distribute other artists like Melvins, Isis, as well as several of Patton's other projects and collaborations.

The label is named after syrup of ipecac, an emetic, or vomit-inducing, medicine. Its slogan is "Ipecac Recordings—Making People Sick Since 1999."

Business practices 

Ipecac is distinguished from most labels (independent labels included) by their policy of signing bands to only one album contracts. Werckman claims that "when starting our label we decided that it did not feel right to “own” the artists on our label. Instead we would rent or license records from artists that we liked." "Lawyers or businesspeople call us morons for only doing one-record deals," Werckman scoffs. "They say, 'You're not really anything, then.' Well, we like our catalogue. We like the records we put out. Our bands aren't rushing away. Our job isn't to own any artist. We're here to put out the art that people create." Low overhead and no video or promotional cost partnered with very little distribution costs allow for hearty royalties. "Every six months I send those guys  royalty checks," Werckman says. "It's great. It's the way it should be. Even bands that are very successful — when they get royalty checks from us, they're stunned."

Ipecac has offices in California.

Artists released on Ipecac Recordings

 Beak
 Bohren & Der Club of Gore
 Circus Devils
 Crystal Fairy
 Imani Coppola
 The Curse of the Golden Vampire
 Dalek (visual artist) / HAZE XXL (Tom Hazelmyer)
 Dälek (musicians)
 Daughters
 The Desert Sessions
 DJ Eddie Def
 Dub Trio
 East West Blast Test
 End
 eX-Girl
 Faith No More (Distribution only)
 Fantômas
 Fantômas Melvins Big Band
 Farmers Market
 Flat Earth Society
 Gangpol & Mit
 General Patton / The X-Ecutioners
 Ghostigital
 The Golding Institute
 Goon Moon
 Guapo
 Neil Hamburger
 Hella
 Zach Hill
 Isis
 Kaada
 Kaada/Patton
 Eyvind Kang
 kid606
 The Kids of Widney High
 Le Butcherettes
 The Locust
 The Lucky Stars
 Lustmord
 MadLove
 Maldoror
 Mark Lanegan & Duke Garwood
 Melvins
 Messer Chups
 Moistboyz
 Mondo Generator
 Mondo Cane
 Ennio Morricone
 Mouse On Mars
 Mugison
 Mutation
 Northern State
 Orthrelm
 Palms
 Peeping Tom
 Phantomsmasher
 Pink Anvil
 Planet B
 Queens of the Stone Age (Vinyl distribution only)
 Qui
 Brian Reitzell
 Omar Rodríguez-López
 Ruins
 Sax Ruins
 Sensational
 Spotlights
 Skeleton Key
 Sleaford Mods
 Steroid Maximus
 Retox
 Rob Swift
 Tanya Tagaq
 The Tango Saloon
 Tipsy
 Tomahawk
 The Book of Knots
 Trevor Dunn's Trio-Convulsant
 Unsane
 Valve
 Venomous Concept
 Vincent & Mr. Green
 Otto Von Schirach
 The Young Gods
 Yoshimi and Yuka
 Zu

See also
 Ipecac Recordings discography
 List of record labels

References

External links
 

American independent record labels
Record labels established in 1999
Alternative rock record labels
Labels distributed by Universal Music Group
1999 establishments in California